Masis FC, was an Armenian football club based in the town of Masis, Ararat Province. They played their home games at the Masis City Stadium.

History
On 7 June 2019, Masis FC was officially founded in by Artur Voskanyan. The club represents the town of Masis. In its first year of foundation, Masis applied to take part in the Armenian First League. After the 2019-2020 Armenian First League season was abandoned, Masis were disqualified and are inactive from professional football.

Domestic history

Current squad

References

Masis
Association football clubs established in 2019
2019 establishments in Armenia